The 2017–18 USC Upstate Spartans women's basketball team represents the University of South Carolina Upstate in the 2017–18 NCAA Division I women's basketball season. The Spartans, led by thirteenth year head coach Tammy George, play their games at G. B. Hodge Center and were members of the Atlantic Sun Conference. They finished the season 11–19, 6–8 in A-Sun play to finish in fifth place. They lost in the quarterfinals of A-Sun Tournament to Lipscomb.

The season marked the final season for USC Upstate as members of the Atlantic Sun Conference, as the school announced on November 15, 2017 that they will be moving to the Big South Conference for the 2018–19 season.

Media
All home games and conference road are shown on ESPN3 or A-Sun.TV. Non conference road games are typically available on the opponents website.

Roster

Schedule

|-
!colspan=9 style="background:#; color:#ffffff;"| Non-conference regular season

|-
!colspan=9 style="background:#; color:#ffffff;"| Atlantic Sun regular season

|-
!colspan=9 style="background:#; color:#ffffff;"| Atlantic Sun Women's Tournament

See also
 2017–18 USC Upstate Spartans men's basketball team

References

USC Upstate
USC Upstate Spartans women's basketball seasons
USC Upstate
USC Upstate